The orangequit (Euneornis campestris) is a species of passerine bird in the tanager family Thraupidae and is the only member of the genus Euneornis. It is endemic to Jamaica where its natural habitats are subtropical or tropical moist lowland forests and heavily degraded former forest.

Breeding
The Orangequit's breeding season is between the months of April and June. The species will build nests out of grass and plant fiber and place them in trees almost six meters above the ground. The female will typically lay 2-4 eggs at a time and will incubate. The appearances differs according to their sex and age.

Taxonomy
The orangequit was formally described by the Swedish naturalist Carl Linnaeus in 1758 in the tenth edition of his Systema Naturae under the binomial name Motacilla campestris. Linnaeus based his description on the "American Hedge-Sparrow" that George Edwards had described and illustrated in his 1750 work, A Natural History of Uncommon Birds, from a specimen collected in Jamaica. The species was moved to the genus Euneornis by the Austrian zoologist Leopold Fitzinger in 1856. The genus name Euneornis combines the Ancient Greek eu meaning "good" with the genus Neornis introduced by Edward Blyth in 1845 and now a junior synonym of Cettia. The specific epithet campestris is Latin and means "of the fields". The species is monotypic: no subspecies are recognised.

Gallery

References

 Raffaele, Herbert; James Wiley, Orlando Garrido, Allan Keith & Janis Raffaele (2003) Birds of the West Indies, Christopher Helm, London.

Thraupidae
Endemic birds of Jamaica
Higher-level bird taxa restricted to the West Indies
Birds described in 1758
Taxa named by Carl Linnaeus
Taxonomy articles created by Polbot